Hind al-Husseini (April 25, 1916 in Jerusalem – September 13, 1994 in Jerusalem) was a Palestinian woman notable for rescuing 55 orphaned survivors of the Deir Yassin massacre, after they were dropped off in Jerusalem and left to fend for themselves. She later converted her grandfather, Salim al-Husayni's mansion into an orphanage to house them, which became a school providing education to orphans and other children from Palestinian towns and villages.

Hind was also dedicated to women's issues, establishing a college for women, and serving in the Arab Women's Union.

Early years

Hind was born to the prominent al-Husseini family in Jerusalem, and was a cousin of the Palestinian military leader Abd al-Qader al-Husseini. She was active in several social work organizations. In the 1930s, Hind joined student unions and was a member of the Women's Solidarity Society. She completed social work courses and she was an educator, becoming headmistress of a Jerusalem girls' school. Later on in the 1940s, she became coordinator of the Arab Women's Union.

Orphanage
In April 1948, near the Holy Sepulcher Church, al-Husseini found a group of 55 children. Because of the dangers posed by the ongoing war, she told the children to go back to their homes. Shortly later, she returned to find the children had not left. One of the children explained that they have no home to return to and that they had survived the Deir Yassin Massacre where the Irgun had killed their families and torn down their homes.

Al-Husseini provided the children shelter in two rooms rented by the Social Work Endeavour Society, a women's charity headed by Al-Husseini. She visited daily, accompanying and feeding the children. Fearful for al-Husseini putting herself at risk by making these trips in a warring area, the head of the Sahyoun convent convinced her to bring the children to the convent. Shortly after, the rooms were hit.

Al-Husseini later relocated the children from the convent to her grandfather's mansion after the ceasefire. The mansion, which was built by her grandfather in 1891 and was her birthplace, was renamed Dar al-Tifl al-Arabi (Arab Children's House). She transformed the mansion into an orphanage providing shelter to children survivors. Al-Husseini raised money, receiving funds from across the world. The orphanage grew and orphans from different villages and cities received their schooling at the orphanage including two Jewish girls who were not accepted at other schools.

Except for preschool level, kindergarten level, and boarding students under 6, the school became a girl-only school in 1967. The student body consisted of 300 orphans in 1995 but soon decreased by half after Gaza Strip was closed off to Jerusalem and Gazan orphans had to return. The number of orphan dropped by every passing year. As of mid-2008, of the 2,000 students, only 35 were orphans.

Committed to the education of women, al-Husseini created the Hind al-Husseini College for Women in 1982. Al-Husseini received awards for her work: the Jordan Globe Medallion for social work (1983), the Jordan Globe Medallion for education (1985), and the First Degree Medallion from Germany (1989).

Film biopic
Actress Hiam Abbass portrayed  Husseini in the 2010 film Miral which was directed by Julian Schnabel. The life and work of Husseini is the subject of the film, largely through the perspective of the titular orphan, Miral (Freida Pinto), Rula Jebreal.

Dar Al Tifl School
Is a Palestinian educational and charitable institution with several activities and branches, the most important of which is the Arab Children's House in Jerusalem.Established on 25 April 1948 by the late Mrs. Hind Al Husseini, the Foundation was established to serve orphans and needy Palestinians by providing care, accommodation, food and entertainment for them. The Foundation was registered on July 7, 1965 in the working records of the Jordanian Ministry of Social Affairs, No. C 254 as a charity on behalf of the Arab Child House Foundation. And was registered as a charitable association with the Palestinian National Authority on 1/1/2010.

Incorporation
After the infamous massacre of Deir Yassin, located on the borders of Jerusalem in 1948 ,demolition of homes, and the killing of most of its residents there. However, some Palestinian Muslims there survived after leaving their village to places close to the city of Jerusalem. Of these, 55 were children whose parents and relatives were killed. They managed to reach the old town in their sleepwear. They were exhausted, tired, desperate, barefoot until they settled in a corner there, leaning on a wall beside the Church of the Holy Sepulcher and Omar Mosque.

They were seen by Hind al-Husseini, who surrounded them and protected them in two small rooms in a small market inside the town called Souq al-Husr. After the situation calmed down slightly and the number of orphans and needy children increased daily as a result of the 1948 war and its economic, social and psychological devastation, she decided to open an institution that cares for orphans, needy Palestinians and even Arabs. She established a Board of Trustees and was its President - with the assistance and expertise of those members and with the support of its friends and benefactors.

Over the years, its services have developed and expanded to the Palestinian community in many areas.

Expansion and sections of the institution
-The Board of Trustees of the Foundation and good friends of individuals and institutions inside and outside Palestine have expanded the institution to include the following sections:
 The internal section, which cares for orphans and needy Palestinians.
 Arab Child House School, consisting of kindergarten, primary school and high school.
 Department of secretarial and sewing.
 Department of Social Work Education (transferred to Al-Quds University )
 Dar Isaaf Nashashibi for Culture, Arts and Literature, which included the Department of Higher Diploma of Islamic Archeology (transferred to Al-Quds University).
 Hind Al Husseini College of Arts, (whose management was transferred to Al Quds University).
 The Palestinian Folklore Museum, to include thousands of traditional Palestinian items of tools and clothing.

Administrative Organization
The first administrative body of the Foundation was formed in 1949, which consisted of members:
 Hind Al Husseini, Owner and President.
 Anwar Al-Khatib, former mayor of Jerusalem.
 Basima Faris, former director of the Mamounieh School.

There have been many changes to this body, with the withdrawal of members and the accession of other members until Ms. Hind Al-Husseini died in 1994 and a new Board of Trustees was formed in 1995 to manage the Foundation.

References

External links
Suffer the Little Children ... by: Daniel A. McGowan, September - October  1996 AMEU
.
Deir Yassin Remembered

1916 births
1994 deaths
Palestinian women
People from Jerusalem
Hind
20th-century Palestinian people